Scoparia valenternota is a species of moth in the family Crambidae. It is endemic in New Zealand.

Taxonomy 
This species was described by George Howes in 1946. However the placement of this species within the genus Scoparia is in doubt. As a result, this species has also been referred to as Scoparia (s.l.) valenternota.

Description 
The wingspan is about 37 mm. The forewings are white with a streak of ochreous-brown shading along the costa. There is a black line from the base on the costal edge. The subterminal and subcostal lines together form a Y-shaped mark. The hindwings are grey-white, but darker on the upper costal and outer terminal areas. Adults have been recorded on wing in December.

References

Moths described in 1946
Moths of New Zealand
Scorparia
Endemic fauna of New Zealand
Taxa named by George Howes (entomologist)
Endemic moths of New Zealand